Undavalli is a southern neighbourhood of Vijayawada city of the Indian state of Andhra Pradesh. It was a village in Tadepalle mandal of Guntur district, prior to its de-notification as gram panchayat. 5th century Buddhist and Hindu Undavalli Caves which signify Monolithic Indian rock-cut architecture are present at this place. It is a part of Vijayawada Urban Agglomeration.

Geography 
It is situated on the south bank of Krishna River.

Governance 

Kakarlamudi gram panchayat is the local self-government of the village. The gram panchayat was awarded Nirmala Grama Puraskaram for the year 2013.

Transport 
The Vijayawada-Amaravati road connects Undavalli with Vijayawada. APSRTC operates buses on this route from Pandit Nehru bus station of Vijayawada.

See also 
List of villages in Guntur district

References 

Neighbourhoods in Vijayawada